KBWS-FM (102.9 FM, "Superstar Country B103") is a radio station licensed to serve Sisseton, South Dakota. The station is owned by Prairie Winds Broadcasting. It airs a country music format.

The station was assigned the KBWS-FM call letters by the Federal Communications Commission on December 15, 1983.

Ownership
In 2004 as part of a reorganization by the Ingstad family, Aberdeen Radio Ranch Inc. (Robert J. Ingstad, co-president) agreed to acquire KGIM, KGIM-FM, KNBZ, and KQKD from Robert E. Ingstad (Pheasant Country Broadcasting). The transaction price was not disclosed. KBWS-FM was retained by Pheasant Country Broadcasting with an agreement to be operated by Ingstad owned Big Stone Broadcasting.

In August 2007, Armada Media Corporation agreed to purchase the assets of radio stations KMSD-AM, KBWS-FM, KDIO-AM and KPHR-FM from Big Stone Broadcasting, Inc., and Pheasant Country Broadcasting, Inc for $2.9 million.

Effective August 30, 2019, Armada Media sold KBWS-FM, five sister stations, and a translator to Prairie Winds Broadcasting, Inc. for a total price of $1.5 million

Programming and history
KBWS-FM airs a country format. Until 1997, the station was branded as B103. Due to owners Pheasant Country Broadcasting's launch of 100,000 watt KGIM-FM "Pheasant Country 103" in the Aberdeen, South Dakota market, KBWS-FM was rebranded Pheasant Country 103 and aired a simulcast of KGIM-FM's programming (excluding a local show from 6am-10am). This created a Pheasant Country 103 brand that could be heard across northeast South Dakota, southeast North Dakota and west central Minnesota. This simulcast was ended in the fall of 2004 due to a reorganization by the Ingstad family. KBWS-FM now airs exclusively local programming derived from its Sisseton, South Dakota studio.

In the late 90s, KBWS-FM moved its studios from its Eden, South Dakota tower site to its current studio location on Veterans Avenue in Sisseton, South Dakota.

References

External links
 Armada Media corporate website
 Official Website
 

BWS-FM
Country radio stations in the United States
Radio stations established in 1983